Gandia is a city and municipality in the Valencian Community, eastern Spain on the Mediterranean. Vehicles can access the city through road N-332.

Gandia operated as an important cultural and commercial centre in the 15th and 16th centuries: in the 15th century it had a university. It was home to several important people, including the poet Ausiàs March (1400-1459) and the novelist Joanot Martorell (1410-1465). It is perhaps best known for the Borja or Borgia, through their family title, Duke of Gandia (originally created in 1399).

 Gandia is one of the largest coastal towns in Spain, with a population over 200,000 during summer, and a centre of commerce and tourism in its region. There are two main zones, Gandia City, which has all the historical monuments, commercial activity, and shopping, and Gandia beach, which has apartments and summer residences used during the summer season. The bars and nightclubs are concentrated in the beach area. As is normal for Spain, nightlife does not begin until well after midnight.

Main sights
 Collegiate Basilica of Gandia
 Ducal Palace of Gandia
 Convent of Santa Clara of Gandia
 Archaeological Museum of Gandia
 Monastery of Sant Jeroni de Cotalba
 Route of the Borgias
 Route of the Monasteries of Valencia
 Route of the Valencian classics

Tourism

With its long, wide, golden, sandy beaches Gandia is one of the major tourist destinations in Spain. Traditionally Gandia's tourism has a domestic base, with the majority coming from Madrid, although in recent years it has been an increasingly popular destination for international tourists, mainly French, German and British.

There are some popular Spanish restaurants around the beach.

Gandia has a number of shopping facilities including shopping malls and chain supermarkets like Carrefour, Carrefour Express, Lidl, Mercadona and Aldi.

Culture
For culture, there are literary contests, the Summer University (Universitat d'Estiu), the International Festival of Classical Music and art exhibitions; sports include water, golf, tennis and hiking.  Gandia hosts the annual Cortoons Gandia animation festival in April, which celebrates international animation and short films.

Geography

Gandia has an important regional wetland with an extension above  in the outskirts of the city, called Marjal de La Safor. This natural area is home to several water plants such as Lemna gibba, Lemna minor, and specially many species of water lily plants, such as Nymphaea alba, Utricularia australis and Potamogeton fluitans. Underwater plants also exist, such as Myriophyllum and Ceratophyllum. Native land plants are mostly formed of various Phragmites species, Typha domingensis, various Scirpus and Cladium species.

Various species of palm trees are naturalised in the area, and they're also found widely in the marjal due to seed dispersion, either wind or animal dispersion. The most common naturalised palm trees in the area are Phoenix dactylifera (African date palm), Washingtonia robusta (Mexican fan palm) and Phoenix canariensis (Canary Island date palm). There are some specimens of the native palm tree Chamaerops humilis (European palmetto), although very few compared to the naturalised species.

This natural zone is also rich in fauna, with many species of birds, fish, amphibian and reptiles, with some mammal species. The most common species of birds are Tachybaptus ruficollis, Anas platyrhynchos, Falco tinnunculus, Fulica atra and Gallinula chloropus amongst many other species. The most common fish and amphibian species are Cobitis maroccana, Anguilla anguilla, Syngnathus abaster, Bufo bufo, Bufo calamita and Rana perezi.

The most common reptiles are turtles, with a native species (Emys orbicularis) which is in critical condition due to the heavy expansion of the Trachemys scripta scripta and Trachemys scripta elegans, most known as Florida turtles, which are introduced species in Spain. Other species of reptiles are Tarentola mauritanica, Podarcis hispanicus and Natrix maura amongst others.

The most common and native mammals are the European rabbits (Oryctolagus cuniculus), the European hedgehog (Erinaceus europaeus), the greater white-toothed shrew Musaranya comuna (Crocidura russula), the European bat (Pipistrellus pipistrellus) and the wild hog (Sus scrofa) amongst others.

Climate
The climate of Gandia is Mediterranean (Köppen climate classification: Csa) with mild winters, and hot summers. The annual average temperature is between 18-19 °C. Gandia receives about 600mm of rain per year, the majority falling from September to November. Autumn is the wettest season.

Sports
The local football team is CF Gandía.

International relations

Twin towns – Sister cities
Gandia is twinned with:
 Laval in France

Public transport 

Regarding public transport, Gandia has an extensive bus network and two Renfe stations that connect the city with Valencia (despite the fact that one of them only has three daily services). About buses, the Gandia area is operated by the company La Marina Gandiense and L'Urbanet. There are two La Marina Gandiense lines, line 1 that connects Gandia with the nearby municipality of Real de Gandia and sometimes with the University and line 2, which connects Gandia to the beach, which is 5 km (3,107 miles) away from the city. Referring to L’Urbanet, there are three lines, although one of them is divided, which would be counted as four. The following lines are:

Line 3: Circular. Starts and ends at the Renfe station in Gandia city

Line 4: Gandia train station - San Francisco de Borja hospital

Line 5: This line has the peculiarity that despite being the same line it makes two totally different routes, which are:
 Gandia train station - Marenys de Rafalcaid
 Gandia train station - Marchuquera

There are also bus lines that connect Gandia with nearby villages such as Daimuz, Guardamar de la Safor, Oliva, etc. There are also some buses which connect Gandia with cities such as Madrid, Salamanca, Medina del Campo, Tordesillas, Teruel, Zaragoza, Bilbao, Galicia, Barcelona, Alicante and Andalucía.

Referring to train services, Gandia has two train stations which connect Gandia with Valencia. Both of them are terminal of line C-1 from Cercanías Valencia. The following stations are: 
 Gandia
 Platja i Grau de Gandia (this one gives service to Gandia’s beach, causing only three daily trains to reach this station)

Notable people 
 

León de Arroyal (1755–1813), intellectual, poet, and writer

See also 
 Monastery of Sant Jeroni de Cotalba
 Collegiate Basilica of Gandia
 Ducal Palace of Gandia
 Ferrocarril Alcoy Gandia
 Route of the Borgias
 Route of the Monasteries of Valencia
 Route of the Valencian classics

Notes

References

External links

Town hall of Gandia 
Official Tourism of Gandia
Gandia Information

 
Municipalities in the Province of Valencia
Seaside resorts in Spain
Route of the Borgias